The Tipperary–Clare rivalry is a hurling rivalry between Irish county teams Tipperary and Clare.

While both teams play provincial hurling in the Munster Senior Hurling Championship, they have also enjoyed success in the All-Ireland Senior Hurling Championship, with Tipperary winning 26 titles and Clare winning three titles. They played against each other in the 1997 All-Ireland Senior Hurling Championship Final, the first time two Munster teams had played in the final.	
			
Revelry between the two teams was at its peak in the late 1990s to early 2000s when they played each other six times in Páirc Uí Chaoimh between 1999 and 2003.

Results since 1990

References

External links
Tipperary v Care all-time results

Tipperary
Tipperary county hurling team rivalries